Madabhushi Sridhar Acharyulu (born 10 November 1956) is an Indian academic and Information Commissioner. He is presently serving as a Dean, School of Law, Mahindra University. He was once a professor at Nalsar University of Law in Hyderabad and Dean at Bennet University. He's an alumnus of the Department of Journalism and Mass Communication at Osmania University.

Early life
He was born in Warangal to Freedom Fighter and Founder Editor of Janadharma Weekly and Warangal Vani Daily, M. S. Acharya and Ranganayakamma. He studied at Masoom Ali High School, AVV Junior College, CKM College, Law College Warangal. He is a post graduate in LL.M., and M.C.J (Journalism) from Osmania University.

Career
Currently he serves as a Dean, School of Law, Mahindra University, Hyderabad. Prior to this he was a professor at School of Law, Bennett University, Greater Noida for over two years before which he was a professor at Nalsar University of Law, Hyderabad, for more than 13 years. He wrote 30 books on law and journalism, in English and Telugu, including four on the Right to Information Act.

Information Commissioner
He was appointed as Information Commissioner on 21 November 2013.

As a writer 
List of Law Books (in English)

List of Publications... 
 RTI: Duty to Disclose, 2019 Revised Edition of RTI Use and Abuse, 2015, Allahabad Law Agency Faridabad, Haryana
 Privacy as Secrecy: (September 2018), Asia Law House, Hyderabad
 Is Bribery a Family Affair? Analysis of Privacy of Public Servants, 2017 publication in Visakhapatnam.
 Telangana, AP Reorganization Act, 2014, Asia Law House, Hyderabad 2015
 Telangana: The 29th State Empowered by Article 3: Mohan Law House Delhi, 2014
 Constitutional Governance and Judicial Process: Editor: Asia Law House, 2014
 Nirbhaya Act (Is it impossible to stop RAPE), Asia Law House, 2013
 New Media- Internet, Module III, PG Diploma Course, Nalsar Pro, Hyderabad. 2011
 Media Law- Policy, Module 1, PG Diploma Course, NalsarPro, Hyderabad.2012
 Judging Right to Information, Center for Good Governance, 2011
 The Other side of Nuclear Liability, All India Lawyers Union AP Committee, 2010
 Environmental Empowerment: Asia Law House, Hyderabad August 2009
 Unfair Rent and Uncontrollable Controls, Asia Law House, Hyderabad, August 2009
 Elections and Media: Kalaala Kaapalaa, Telugu Book on role of media in covering elections, AP Press Academy, Hyderabad. 2009 March
 Law of Expression: (Law for Media) Asia Law House, Hyderabad, May 2007 publication, Pages 1300
 Co-editor: P.A. Choudary's Vision and Mission, Indian Constitutional Governance (analysis of Judgments of Justice Choudary) Asia Law House, Hyderabad, 2007 June.
 Ramaswamy Iyer's Law of Torts, Co-author, with Prof A. Lakshminath, published by Butterworth's, New Delhi, 2007
 Right to Information, Wadhwa, Nagpur, 2006, New Delhi
 Alternative Dispute Resolution, Negotiation and Mediation, 2006, Butterworth's, New Delhi Legal Language, Asia Law House, Hyderabad.
 “FIR, Arrest & Bail” published by Asia Law House.
 "Appointment of Judges: A Critical Analysis", A Research Project for publication to Lok Satta, Hyderabad
 Constitutional Foundations of Media Law, Module II, PG Diploma Course, Nalsar Pro, Hyderabad, 2010
 Advertisements and Law, Fourth Module for Media Law, PG Diploma Course, Nalsar-pro, Hyderabad. 2010

List of Books (in Telugu) 
 Nilichi Gelichina Telangana, (Telugu book on formation of Telangana State) Asia Law House, 2015
 Andhra Pradesh Vibhajana Chattam, 2014, Telugu Book on AP Reorganization Act, 2014, Asia Law House, Hyderabad, 2015.
 Supreme Court Judgment on Salwa Judum, 2013
 Ayodhya Teerpu: Telugu book on Ayodhya Judgment, published by EMESCO, Hyderabad, 2011
 Right to Information Telugu Booklet, published by Telugu University and AP Official Language Commission, 2006
 Equal Rights to Daughters, Telugu Book published by Telugu University and AP Official Language Commission, 2006
 Dharmasana Chaitanyam, (Judicial Activism in Telugu)
 Kaarmika Chattalu (Labour Laws in Telugu) revised in 2013
 FIR, Arrest & Bail (Telugu) Revised in 2012
 Mahilalu Chattalu (Women & Law in Telugu) Revised in 2012
 Panchanama (Telugu)
 Patrikarachana -ParuvuNastam - Court dhikkaram, writing for the press, Defamation and Contempt of Court in Telugu publication by A.P. Press Academy, Hyderabad)
 Nyayavyavastha (Judicial System), a book in Telugu, published by Telugu Academy, Government of Andhra Pradesh, Hyderabad, 2004
 Paryavarana Parijnanam, Environmental Law in Telugu, published by NALSAR under Environment Capacity building programme. 2003
 Booklets for National Human Rights Commission
 Bonded Labour, NALSAR- NHRC booklet published, (Telugu Booklet) April 2005
 Manual Scavenging, NALSAR- NHRC (Telugu Booklet), April 2005
 Human Rights Commission, NALSAR- NHRC (Telugu Booklet), April 2005
 International Treaties on Human Rights, NALSAR- NHRC (Telugu Booklet), April 2005
 Sexual Harassment, NALSAR- NHRC (Telugu Booklet), April 2005
 Human Rights and AIDS, NALSAR- NHRC (Telugu Booklet), April 2005
 Child Labour, NALSAR- NHRC (Telugu Booklet), April 2005
 Rights of Disabled, NALSAR- NHRC (Telugu Booklet), April 2005

In Telugu

Awards 
 Best Teacher Award, Andhra Pradesh Government - September 2013

References

External links
 Official profile

Academic staff of NALSAR University of Law
People from Warangal
1956 births
Living people
Telugu poets
Poets from Telangana
Poets from Andhra Pradesh
Academic staff of Mahindra University